The 2010 UEFA European Under-17 Championship was the ninth edition of UEFA's European Under-17 Football Championship, held in Liechtenstein from 18 to 30 May 2010. The hosts decided not to field a team, fearing it would not be competitive enough for the tournament's prestige; their place was occupied by France, the best runner-up in the qualification's elite round. Germany was the 2009 title holder, but failed to qualify. In the final, England defeated Spain by 2–1, and achieved their first ever under-17 European title.

Qualification

The final tournament of the 2010 UEFA European Under-17 Championship was preceded by two qualification stages: a qualifying round and an Elite round. During these rounds, 52 national teams competed to determine the eight teams.

Participants
 
 
 
 
 
 
 
 

Despite being hosts, Liechtenstein did not participate in the finals. They withdrew from the competition after raising concerns with UEFA that their U-17 side would not be competitive, and devalue the tournament.

Squads

Match officials 
A total of six referees, eight assistant referees and two fourth officials were appointed for the final tournament.

Referees
 Vadims Direktorenko
 Artyom Kuchin
 Antti Munukka
 Euan Norris
 Stanislav Todorov
 Christof Virant

Assistant referees
 Angelo Boonman
 Roland Brandner
 Orkhan Mammadov
 Sven Erik Midthjell
 Nikola Razic
 Marco Tropeano
 Laszlo Viszokai
 Matej Zunic

Fourth officials
 Alain Bieri
 Stephan Klossner
The match officials were observed by Markus Nobs and Andreas Schluchter from Switzerland.

Group stage

Group A

Group B

Knockout stage

Bracket

Semi-finals

Final

Goalscorers

6 goals
  Paco Alcácer

3 goals
  Connor Wickham
  Gerard Deulofeu
  Artun Akçakın

2 goals
  Ross Barkley
  Anthony Koura
  Paul Pogba
  Yaya Sanogo
  Ricardo Esgaio

1 goal
  Roman Haša
  Jakub Plšek
  Benik Afobe  
  Saido Berahino
  Robert Hall
  Joshua McEachran
  Andre Wisdom
  Dimitris Diamantakos
  Mateus Fonseca
  Juan Bernat
  Jorge Ortí Gracia
  Jesé
  Aleksandar Žarković
  Taşkın Çalış
  Okan Derici
  Okay Yokuşlu

Technical team selection

Goalkeepers
  13. Jack Butland
  13. Adrián Ortolá
Defenders
  5. Víctor Álvarez
  3. Luke Garbutt
  2. Tomáš Kalas
  2. Youssouf Sabaly
  14. Filip Twardzik
  6. Andre Wisdom

Midfielders
  16. Ross Barkley
  8. José Campaña
  4. Conor Coady
  8. João Mário
  15. Josh McEachran
  5. Jakub Plšek
  6. Paul Pogba
  15. Eliott Sorin
Attackers
  9. Benik Afobe
  9. Paco Alcácer
  17. Gerard Deulofeu
  7. Jesé
  9. Yaya Sanogo
  17. Connor Wickham

References

External links
 Uefa.com

 
2009–10 in European football
2010
International association football competitions hosted by Liechtenstein
2009–10 in Liechtenstein football
May 2010 sports events in Europe
2010 in youth association football